Thelma is a female given name.

Thelma may also refer to:

Arts and entertainment
 Thelma (novel), an 1887 novel by Marie Corelli
 Thelma (1910 film), an adaptation of Corelli's novel
 Thelma (1918 film), an adaptation of Corelli's novel
 Thelma (1922 film), an American silent film
 Thelma (2011 film), a Filipino film 
 Thelma (2017 film), a Norwegian film directed by Joachim Trier
 Thelma (opera), by Samuel Coleridge-Taylor
 "Thelma", a song by John Lee Hooker
 Thelma Records, Detroit, Michigan record label 1962-66

Species
 Elachista thelma, a moth of family Elachistidae
 Syrnola thelma, a sea snail of family Pyramidellidae
 Trissodoris thelma, a moth of family Cosmopterigidae

Other uses
 Tropical Storm Thelma (disambiguation), various storms, cyclones and typhoons
 Thelma, Kentucky, United States, an unincorporated community
 B K Thelma (born 1955), Indian biologist/geneticist